The Best (aka t.A.T.u. The Best) is a CD set from the Russian group t.A.T.u. featuring hit singles, rare mixes, three previously unreleased tracks, a live concert, music videos and more. There are two versions of the set, one with only a CD, and another with a CD and a DVD (sometimes referred to as the "Deluxe Edition"). In Korea, the Deluxe Edition came with a poster. In the U.S., only the CD version was sold, and only in Best Buy stores. However, for U.S. online retailers, it was available, and for some by import from Korea.

The Best was t.A.T.u.'s final release with the Universal Music Group label. Previously they went through Universal International.

Release
The set was released on September 4, 2006, in Korea and Brazil, September 11 in Europe, September 27 in Japan, September 29 in Germany and October 10 in the U.S. It was later releases on the iTunes Store on November 7. There were different releases of the album, including a cassette, compact disc, DVD and vinyl.

Facts and missing songs
There were a lot of facts, misspelled words and other associated issues with the album.
On the sides there is missing a dot in the t.A.T.u. logo. The song "Ya Soshla S Uma" was misspelled on the back cover. It was listed as "Ya Soshia S Uma". While "Nas Ne Dogonyat" was spelled as "Nas Ne Dagoniat" (although it is a valid transliteration). Both those versions are not the Russian edits.

The album claims to have 3 unreleased songs, although in actuality, only "Null and Void" was unreleased. The other two songs were a remix and the previously released "Divine". The album lists "Divine" as an extended edit but it is the same version included as the b-side on the "All About Us" single release.

The album was also going to include the track "Prostye Dvizheniya". However, for unknown reasons, it was not included.

GraceNote incorrectly reports the first track name as "Radio" instead of "All About Us" when the CD is listened to in iTunes.

The cover does not list the videos for "Friend or Foe" or "All About Us (edited version)". However, these videos were included on the DVD.

Critical reception

The Best received generally positive reviews from music critics. Stephen Thomas Erlwine from AllMusic gave it four out of five stars. He concluding saying "since a little t.A.T.u. can go a long way, it's best to get all the big hits in one place; the rest of the record might still be filler even on a hits disc, but at least it has all the big songs, which The Best certainly does, and that should satisfy any listener who considers the Russian duo a guilty pleasure." However, he did say that the album was too early for a release.

Track listing

•: 2002 version, the edit used on the English counterpart of 200 Po Vstrechnoy, 200 Km/H in the Wrong Lane

Disc 2 (DVD)

Charts

Weekly charts

Monthly charts

References

T.A.T.u. albums
2006 compilation albums
2006 video albums
2006 live albums
Live video albums
Music video compilation albums
Interscope Records compilation albums
Interscope Records live albums
Interscope Records video albums
Universal Records compilation albums
Universal Records video albums
Universal Records live albums